Squeezit was a fruit-flavored juice made by General Mills and marketed from 1985 until the middle of 2001. Squeezit also appeared in stores from mid-2006 to mid-2007 and in 2011 and 2012. The drink came in a plastic bottle that the drinker had to squeeze in order to extract the beverage from its container, hence the name.

Squeezit came in multiple flavors and editions, one of which contained "color pellets" that the drinker dropped into the bottle to change the color of the Squeezit. The flavors included Chucklin' Cherry, Berry B. Wild, Grumpy Grape (later changed to Gallopin' Grape), Silly Billy Strawberry, Rockin' Red Puncher, Mean Green Puncher, Smarty Arty Orange, and Troppi Tropical Punch. Each flavor had a different character designed into the plastic bottle. For a limited time there were "mystery" flavors in black bottles, where the drinker had to guess the flavor. There were also Life Savers Squeezit, featuring flavors such as Wild Watermelon, Blue Raspberry, and Tropical Fruit.

Twist N Squeeze
In the UK, a similar drink existed known as Twist N Squeeze, sold in similar bottle designs and similar flavours. These drinks are still available, although they are now sold under the name "Squeeze It".

See also
 List of defunct consumer brands

References

Soft drinks
General Mills brands
Defunct consumer brands
Discontinued products